Hugh ( 1074 – c. 1125) was the Count of Champagne from 1093 until his death.

Hugh was the third son of Theobald III, Count of Blois and Adele of Valois, bearing the title Count of Bar-sur-Aube. His older brother Odo IV, Count of Troyes, died in 1093, leaving him master of Troyes, where he centred his court, Bar-sur-Aube and Vitry-le-François. In this way the three contiguous countships that formed the core of an emerging Champagne were united in his person, and though he preferred "Count of Troyes", the oldest of his lordships and site of the only bishopric in his domains, many contemporary documents call him the count of Champagne, the title preferred by his descendants.

His first recorded act, a monastic gift in 1094, became the oldest document of the comital archive. The act of his that resonated longest in history was his grant of lands in 1115 to the monk Bernard of the reformed Benedictines at Cîteaux—the Cistercians—in order to found Clairvaux Abbey, a Cistercian monastery at Clairvaux (in the present Ville-sous-la-Ferté), in a wild valley of a tributary of the Aube, where Bernard was appointed abbot and became famous as Bernard of Clairvaux. Hugh's charter makes over to the new foundation Clairvaux and its dependencies, fields, meadows, vineyards, woods and water. A deeply affectionate letter from Bernard to Hugh survives, written in 1125, as Hugh went off for a third time to fight in the Holy Land, joining the Knights Templar, leaving his pregnant wife, and disinheriting his son Odo – according to later sources, Hugh believed himself impotent and never acknowledged his son. Instead, he transferred his titles to his nephew, who became Theobald II of Champagne.  Odo's two sons, Odo II of Champlitte and William of Champlitte were important figures in the Fourth Crusade.

Hugh married first Constance, daughter of King Philip I of France and Bertha of Holland.  Their only child, a son called Manasses, died young. He married second Isabella, daughter of Stephen I, Count of Burgundy and niece of Pope Callixtus II and they had issue:
 Eudes/Odo I, married to Sibylle de La Ferte-sur-L'Aube and had two sons:
 Odo II of Champlitte died 1204, one of the leaders of the IV Crusade.
 William I 1160s - 1209, prince of Achaea and founder of the Principality.

When Hugh became a Knight Templar himself in 1125, the Order comprised few more than a dozen knights, and the first Grand Master of the Templars was a vassal of his, Hugues de Payens, who had been with him at Jerusalem in 1114. While in the kingdom of Jerusalem, Hugh appeared with the king, Baldwin II, in two documents, but there is no trace of him after 1130. 

Hugh was also the generous patron of the abbeys of Montieramey Abbey and of Molesme, making grants from his castle of Isle-Aumont, south of Troyes. In a surviving letter to him from Ivo of Chartres (Letter CCCXLV), the Bishop of Chartres reminds him of his obligations of marriage, perhaps to deter him from making vows of continence.

References

Sources

External links
Hugues of Champagne (1093–1125) 
The same 

Counts of Champagne
Medieval Knights Templar members
Medieval French knights
1070s births
1125 deaths
House of Blois
12th-century French people